His Majesty's Coastguard (HMCG) is a section of the Maritime and Coastguard Agency responsible, through the Secretary of State for Transport to Parliament, for the initiation and co-ordination of all maritime search and rescue (SAR) within the UK Maritime Search and Rescue Region. This includes the mobilisation, organisation and tasking of adequate resources to respond to persons either in distress at sea, or to persons at risk of injury or death on the cliffs or shoreline of the United Kingdom. It is also responsible for land based search and rescue helicopter operations from 2015.

The chief executive of the Maritime and Coastguard Agency is Brian Johnson. Operational control of the service is the responsibility of the Director of HM Coastguard, Claire Hughes.

His Majesty's Coastguard is not a military force nor law enforcement agency, with coastal defence being the responsibility of the Royal Navy, law enforcement being the responsibility of the local territorial police force and maritime border control being the responsibility of Border Force. However, the organisation is a uniformed service.

History
HM Coastguard was established in 1822. In 1809 the Preventive Water Guard was established, which may be regarded as the immediate ancestor of HM Coastguard. Its primary objective was to prevent smuggling, but it was also responsible for giving assistance to shipwrecks. For this reason, each Water Guard station was issued with Manby's Mortar (the mortar fired a shot with a line attached from the shore to the wrecked ship and was used for many years). In 1821 a committee of inquiry recommended that responsibility for the Preventive Water Guard should be transferred from HM Treasury to the Board of Customs. The Board of Custom and the Board of Excise each had their own long-established preventive forces: shore-based Riding Officers and sea-going Revenue Cruisers. The committee recommended the consolidation of these various related services.  The Treasury agreed, and in a Minute dated 15 January 1822 directed that they be placed under the authority of the Board of Customs and named the Coast Guard.

The new Coast Guard inherited a number of shore stations and watch houses from its predecessor bodies as well as several coastal vessels, and these provided bases for its operations over the following years. In 1829 the first Coast Guard instructions were published, dealing mainly with discipline and the prevention of smuggling; they also stipulated that when a wreck took place the Coast Guard was responsible for taking all possible action to save lives, taking charge of the vessel and protecting property. In 1831, the Coast Guard took over duties from the Coast Blockade for the Suppression of Smuggling (which had been run by the Admiralty from a string of Martello Towers on the Kent and Sussex coast); this finally gave it authority over the whole of the UK coastline.

In the 1850s, with smuggling on the wane, oversight of the Coast Guard was transferred from the Board of Customs to the Admiralty. In the decades that followed, the Coast Guard (or Coastguard, as it came to be called) began to function more like an auxiliary Naval service, a recruitment ground for future naval personnel. Responsibilities for revenue protection were retained, but hands-on rescue services began to be undertaken more and more by Volunteer Life Brigades and by the lifeboats of the RNLI, with the Coast Guard acting in a support role.

By the start of the twentieth century, there was a growing sense of dissatisfaction with the service expressed both by the Board of Customs (concerned for revenue protection) and by the Board of Trade (responsible for safety at sea). In the wake of the First World War, moves were made to address these deficiencies. In 1923 the Coastguard was re-established as a coastal safety and rescue service, overseen by the Board of Trade. Its skills in maritime communication (acquired during the Admiralty years, when Coastguard officers often manned signal stations) were recognized, with provision being made for the use of new communication technologies for safety at sea. There was also a renewed determination to recruit, train and co-ordinate volunteer rescue personnel with the establishment in 1931 of a Coastal Life-saving Corps, later renamed the Coastguard Auxiliary Service (see Coastguard Rescue Service, below).

For the rest of the twentieth century, the Coastguard continued to operate primarily out of local shore stations (use of ships had declined after 1923). In 1931 in England there were 193 stations and 339 auxiliary stations; in 1974 there were still 127 stations (permanently manned) and 245 auxiliary stations. From the 1960s onwards, though, priorities were changing from maintaining coastal lookouts to provision of co-ordinated search and rescue services. Old watch houses, with their on-site accommodation and annexed boathouses, gave way to new technology-based Maritime Rescue Co-ordination Centres, far fewer in number. Efficiency drives in the 1990s made His Majesty's Coastguard a government executive agency, then in 1998 the Marine Safety Agency and the Coastguard Agency were joined to become the Maritime and Coastguard Agency (MCA).

The Coastguard Rescue Service

The Coastguard Rescue Service is made up of 352 teams located near the coast in stations around the UK, with the most coastal rescue stations in the UK. The teams are made up of Coastguard Rescue Officers (CROs) who are volunteers trained to carry out rescues and provide assistance to those in distress on the UK's coastline.  There are approximately 3500 CROs and they carry out rope rescue, mud rescue, water rescue and search duties in all weathers and at all times.  The teams are paged by the Joint Rescue Coordination Centre (JRCC) or Maritime Rescue Coordination Centre (MRCC) and respond to emergencies.  They also assist other authorities such as the Police, Fire and Ambulance with their specialist expertise.  The Coastguard Rescue Teams (CRT) will also provide safety advice to those they rescue and members of the public.

After recovering any casualty the CRTs will provide the assistance needed then will transfer them to a place of safety.  The teams will also provide support to the lifeboats and SAR helicopters per tasking by the Operations Centres.

Search and rescue

The Coastguard Rescue teams carry out searches of the shoreline which, depending on the team's location, could be urban or remote, beach, mud or cliff.  The searches could be for vessels, wreckage, people who have abandoned ship, or missing persons. This is referred to as Lost and Missing Persons Search (L&MPS).

Water safety and rescue
Due to the nature of the work carried out by CROs they are trained to be safe when in or near the water.  They are trained to be able to carry out rescues in extremely rough conditions and the team will work together to recover the casualty from danger while ensuring that each team member is safe.

The training the CRT have will depend on the location of the CRT. All teams are trained in land search methods, water rescue and casualty care.

Mud rescue

Mud rescue is described as the most physically demanding type of rescue there is. Mud rescue technicians walk on the mud using equipment to prevent them getting stuck, and recover casualties.  In most cases these are people who have become too tired to continue walking on the mud while taking a shortcut.  The CRTs also have rescue equipment to extract people deeply stuck in mud, including inflatable rescue walkways, mud lances, and specialist footwear inspired by ducks' feet.

Rope rescue

Rope rescue methods are to recover casualties who have fallen or are stuck on cliffs or difficult to reach areas, be they rural or urban. The teams work together to lower a rope rescue technician who will assess the casualty, provide first aid treatment if necessary and then recover the casualty to safety, before transferring the casualty to the next level of care as required.

Casualty Care (CERCC) 
Each team member receives extensive casualty care training that goes much further than just basic first aid, the course known as CERC (Coastguard Emergency Responder Casualty Care) is taught by a team of trainers locally around the coast with regular role play training and evaluation. Each CRO is required to have his/her CERC qualification re-validated every three years. 

The HMCG CERCC qualification is bench marked at Level D (Diploma) of the PHEM framework from the Faculty of Pre-Hospital Care, and is also equivalent in syllabus content to the First Response Emergency Care Level 3 Certificate (FREC 3) level.

In 2017 the CERCC course was updated to reflect and include latest research and guidance such as implementation of the 2015 European Council Resuscitation Guidelines, 2017 JRCALC Guidelines and the British Thoracic Society Oxygen Guidelines. Each frontline Coastguard Rescue vehicle carries a fully stocked Coastguard Emergency Responder Bag which includes a first aid kit, pelvic splint, frac straps, airways set (OPA & NPA), trauma dressings, airway suction kit + bag, valve & mask set. 

In 2022 HM Coastguard provided each operational team with a Heartsine Samaritan 500p Automated External Defibrillator (AED).

Role and responsibilities

The Maritime and Coastguard Agency (MCA) is an  executive agency responsible throughout Britain for implementing the Government's maritime safety policy. That includes initiating and co-ordinating search and rescue at sea or on the coast through His Majesty's Coastguard, checking that ships meet British and international safety rules and preventing coastal pollution.

Typical emergencies to which the Coastguard is summoned include:

 Persons in difficulties in the water;
 Persons in difficulties on the coastline;
 Pleasure craft with problems;
 Medical emergencies on vessels, installations or offshore islands;
 Incidents involving oil installations;
 Persons threatening or attempting suicide on the coast or bridges over estuaries;
 Missing persons on the coast;
 Merchant vessels with problems;
 Evacuating injured or ill persons at sea;
 Groundings;
 Collisions at sea;
 Reports of suspected Ordnance.

Ships in distress or the public reporting an accident should make a Mayday call on MF radio, marine VHF radio channel 16, or by dialling 999 or 112 on a telephone. The Coastguard MRCCs continuously monitor all the maritime distress frequencies (including the international VHF distress signal frequency 156.8 MHz i.e. channel 16) and have access to satellite based monitoring systems. The MRCC then co-ordinates the emergency response. This normally involves requesting the launch of a local RNLI lifeboat (the RNLI being an independent organization), launching an independent lifeboat, deploying a local Coastguard Rescue Team, or a Search and Rescue helicopter, making broadcasts and requesting assistance from vessels in the area. Depending on the circumstances of each incident, the Coastguard MRCC may also request for other emergency services to be deployed to the incident or to meet other units returning from the incident, for example in the case of a medical emergency. A list of common 'Declared Assets' is below:

HM Coastguard's own CRO (Coastguard Rescue Officers) Initial Response and Coastguard Rescue Teams;
Inshore lifeboats, all-weather lifeboats and inshore rescue hovercraft operated by the Royal National Lifeboat Institution
Other nominated inshore rescue services
Search and rescue helicopters under contract to the MCA
Ministry of Defence Helicopters and fixed wing aircraft operated by the Royal Air Force (RAF) and Royal Navy (RN)
Emergency towing vessels (ETV) – powerful tugs contracted to the MCA
Nominated Fire Service teams for cliff and mud rescue as well as firefighting and chemical incident response for vessels at sea
Nominated beach lifeguard units

Declared Assets are facilities that have given a declaration to the Coastguard of a certain level of availability or training. Other assets that may be tasked to assist with any incident include; Mountain Rescue, Military Police, The Fire and Rescue Service and volunteer lifeguards. In addition, various 'Memorandums of Understanding' exist between the Coastguard and other emergency services to establish priority when working in each other's areas. For example, police officers needing to carry out a search of the shoreline.

The Coastguard has ten rescue helicopters based around the United Kingdom (at Stornoway Airport, Sumburgh Airport, Prestwick, Inverness Airport, Caernarfon Airport, Humberside Airport, St Athan, Lydd, Newquay Airport, Lee-on-Solent).

Operations

When HM Coastguard receive a distress call by a 999 or 112 phone call, by radio or any other means at the MRCC, a Maritime or Senior Maritime Operations Officer will use their training to question the caller to determine the location.  The Maritime Operations Officer will normally be able to confirm the location given by the caller if the call is on the 999 system as the equipment in the Operations room will display where it has come from.  The use of the equipment is very important because when people are in a distress situation it is easy for them to make mistakes as they may be frightened, anxious and/or uncertain. Coastguard Rescue Teams are paged via an SMS based system detailing the emergency incident, or via a VHF pager, although these are being phased out.

The Maritime Operations Officer will use the correct chart or map for the area and they are trained to ask questions that will help the caller identify where they are.  The coastguard SMC (SAR Mission Co-ordinator) in charge of the watch will then decide which rescue resources will be used to conduct the SAR operation. The Maritime Operations Officer who takes the call may keep talking to the caller, while another can be passing information to the chosen rescue resources.  These assets will depend on the situation, but could be one of the 365 Coastguard Rescue Teams (CRT) around the UK coast made up of 3,500 Coastguard Rescue Officers, RNLI or independent lifeboats, Search and Rescue Helicopters or a vessel or aircraft known to be in the vicinity or who responds to a broadcast on radio made by the MRCC.

The MRCC will call out and send the rescue units according to the nature and severity of the incident. The MRCC will then co-ordinate the SAR operation using the Coastguard Rescue Teams, lifeboats and helicopters or other vessels or aircraft, who carry out the physical rescue.

Coastguard Rescue Teams have an Officer in Charge who is responsible for the action of that team or unit, management of the scene and joint coordination of the rescue with the MRCC.  If the caller is, for example, stuck in mud, the CRT Officer in Charge (OIC) will coordinate which of the team goes onto the mud to carry out the rescue. If it is someone stuck on a cliff the OIC will coordinate who is lowered over the cliff. All this is done while keeping the MRCC updated of their actions, and possibly being supported by lifeboats or a rescue helicopter.  Each rescue resource is able to relay information about any casualty to each other and to the MRCC who retains overall coordination.  The coxswain of a lifeboats and the SAR helicopter pilot would be in command of that rescue asset, whilst being coordinated by the MRCC or the OIC.

The rescue resources work together with the MRCC as the coordinating authority to carry out SAR response. Once the persons in danger are rescued the person is then given the assistance they need and then transferred to a place of safety.

Ceremonial
HM Coastguard also parade at local Remembrance Parades and selected officers parade at the annual Remembrance Sunday parade at the Cenotaph in London.

Locations
HM Coastguard co-ordinates activities from one Joint Rescue Coordination Centre (JRCC), nine Maritime Rescue Coordination Centres (MRCCs) and one Maritime Rescue Sub-Centre (MRSC).

 JRCC UK at the National Maritime Operations Centre at Fareham. Incorporating Solent Coastguard, the UK Aeronautical Rescue Coordination Centre (ARCC) and UK Cospas-Sarsat Mission Control Centre (UKMCC).
 MRCC Aberdeen
 MRCC Belfast (Bangor)
 MRCC Shetland
 MRCC Stornoway
 MRCC Falmouth
 MRCC Holyhead
 MRCC Milford Haven
 MRCC Dover
 MRCC Humber (Bridlington)
 MRSC London

All centres operate 24 hours a day. In addition Coastguard Rescue Teams are based locally at over 300 locations around the UK.

Recent changes

The modernisation of HM Coastguard was completed on the 31 December 2015. This has seen a significant reduction in operation centres.  The following MRCCs have had operational capability transferred to remaining MRCCs:
 Clyde (closed, area transferred to Stornoway and Belfast)
 Forth (closed, area transferred to Aberdeen)
 Brixham (closed, area transferred to Falmouth and JRCC)
 Portland (closed September 2014, area transferred to JRCC)
 Solent (closed September 2014, area transferred to JRCC)
 Great Yarmouth (closed, area transferred to Humber)
 Liverpool (closed, area transferred to Holyhead)
 Swansea (closed, area transferred to Milford Haven)
 Thames (closed, area transferred to Dover)

As well as its own operations as described above the JRCC has operation oversight across the rest of the national network at the remaining Centres. In addition the small London coastguard centre, which is annexed to the Port of London Authority headquarters, will maintain its oversight of activity on the River Thames.

Aircraft

Fixed wing

Operated by 2Excel Aviation
 3 Beechcraft King Air B200 - pollution patrol, surveillance, search and rescue
 2 Piper PA-31 Navajo - pollution patrol, surveillance, search and rescue

Operated by RVL Group
 1 Beechcraft King Air B200 - pollution patrol, surveillance, search and rescue 
 1 Boeing 737-400F - Oil Spill response

Helicopters (operated by Bristow under contract)
 10 Sikorsky S-92 - search and rescue
 10 Leonardo AW189 - search and rescue

Under a 10-year £1.6 billion contract starting in 2015, Bristow Helicopters assumed responsibility for search and rescue operations within the United Kingdom on behalf of HM Coastguard. Under the contract, Sikorsky S-92 and Leonardo AW189 helicopters operate from 10 locations around the British Isles. Ten S-92s are based, two per site, at Stornoway, Sumburgh, Humberside, Newquay and Caernarfon. Ten AW189s operate, two per site, from Prestwick airport, Inverness, Lydd, Lee-on-the-Solent and St Athan. Two aircraft are kept in reserve. All bases are operational 24 hours a day. Half of the new fleet was built in Yeovil, Somerset.

The Maritime & Coastguard Agency are launching a tender for their second generation UK search and rescue aviation programme (UKSAR2G), which is one of several tenders for similar services. In July 2022 the contract was awarded to Bristow Helicopters, worth £1.6 billion over 10 years.

Communications & Technology

Communications
A variety of communication platforms are used depending on the individual asset and situation. Communication involving Coastguard Rescue Teams, inshore lifeboats (operated by the RNLI), other nominated inshore rescue teams and SAR air assets (both MOD and MCA) typically take place over VHF marine radio. Communication between normal vessels and HM Coastguard/Maritime Rescue Co-ordination Centres can take place over VHF radio, MF radio and telephone (Satellite, Landline and Mobile).

HMCG have their own VHF radio network spread across the entire British Coast, this includes sites located on the Isle of Man, Northern Ireland and Remote Scottish Islands. There are also sites inland to support Search & Rescue in the Lake District. The network is designed in such a way that any Operator can monitor & transmit from any radio site location. A recent upgrade to the radio network has introduced even better resilience and alternative connectivity to ensure continuity of service.

HMCG also have access to and use the Airwave service available to all Category 1 & 2 responders in the UK. This allows better communication between other Emergency Service partners. 

List of utilised communications within HMCG:

 VHF (Very High Frequency) (Primary radio communications method)
 MF (Medium Frequency)
 PSTN (Public Service Telephone Network) (Used for 999 & Routine telephone calls)
 Airwave

Technology
HMCG has invested heavily in introducing state of the art systems & services to aid Search & Rescue, started in 2014 after the organisational restructure a dedicated computer network was introduced specifically used for operational working. In more recent years a rolling refresh of technology continues to keep the service at the cutting edge of all available technology. 

Coastguard Rescue Stations have recently benefited from the installation of new Wifi services & tablet devices (one per station), as well as new web services for volunteers for communications and training. 

As part of the recent UKSAR2G tender, unmanned aircraft (drones) technology has been provisioned, with feeds potentially being provided to Maritime Rescue Coordination Centres (MRCC) for better incident working.

Rank structure

Current rank structure (Full Time Coastguard and Volunteer Coastguard Rescue Service)
King Charles III is the Honorary Commodore of HMCG, and wears a uniform with the ranks insignia of Chief Coastguard plus an extra bar.

Rank structure during WW2
HM Coastguard came under the  control of the Admiralty in 1940.

Former rank structure
 Chief Coastguard
 Chief Boatman (Chf Btman / Chief Bn / Chief Boatn)
 Chief Officer (Chf Officer)
 Commissioned Boatman (Comd Bn / Comd Btman)
 Boatman (Boatn)
 Provisional Boatman (Provs B'man)
 Permanent Extraman (Permanent Extraman)
 Temporary Extraman (Tempo Y Exta)

Uniform
As a uniformed service, but with Coastal responsibilities and maritime traditions, HMCG's uniform appearance is similar to the Royal Navy, the former HM Customs and Excise and HM Revenue and Customs. 
There are three types of uniforms:

Formal
Blues (daily duties)
Personal Protective Uniform (PPE) uniform

Formal uniform

Males
white-topped peaked cap with HMCG capbadge
white shirt and black tie
dark blue Reefer jacket with two rows of buttons
dark blue trousers
dark polished shoes
black gloves

Females
white-topped bowler cap with HMCG capbdage
white shirt and black tie
dark blue Reefer jacket with two rows of buttons
dark blue trousers or skirt with dark tights
dark polished shoes
black gloves.

Medal ribbons are worn on the left breast. Rank (if any) is worn on both cuffs. "HM Coastguard" shoulder titles are worn on each shoulder of the tunic. For public duties (e.g. the annual Remembrance Parade at the Cenotaph in London), a greatcoat is worn. Black (everyday/formal) or white (formal only) gloves may be worn.

Some officers may carry Naval style swords for formal parades.

Undress
Akin to the RN No. 3 dress, everyday uniform is similar to the above, except the tunic is replaced with a 'wooly-pully' jumper.

Males
white-topped peaked cap with HMCG capbdage
white shirt and black tie
dark blue NATO style jumper
dark blue trousers
dark polished shoes

Females
white-topped bowler cap with HMCG capbdage
white shirt and black tie
dark blue NATO style jumper
dark blue trousers
dark polished shoes.

Rank slides are worn on epaulettes, along with HMCG identifiers. Medal ribbons may be worn on the shirt Name tags may also be worn. In summer months, a short sleeved, open-necked shirt may be worn instead of the tie and jumper.

'Blues' (daily duties)
Akin to RN No. 4 dress, for more outdoor work, HMCG officers and CROs wear:

White-topped peaked cap with HMCG capbadge
Blue shirt with pockets
Dark blue 'wooly-pully'jumper
Blue cargo trousers
Black boots.

Personal Protective Equipment (PPE) rescue uniform

For coastal rescue uniforms, CROs wear the following:

Overalls
Safety boots
Helmet + Helmet headlight
Safety glasses
Safety goggles
Safety gloves
High visibility wet weather gear
A high visibility buff (a neck-worn protector)
Micro fleece
ADS t-shirt
Technical trousers
Socks (upon request)
Mobile phone or pager
Personal radio.

Exterior items are appropriately marked to identify them as rescue workers.

See also
 H.M. Coastguard Long Service and Good Conduct Medal
 Trinity House
 Royal National Lifeboat Institution (RNLI)
 Isle of Man Coastguard
 Irish Coast Guard

References

External links 
 

1829 establishments in the United Kingdom
Coast guards
Coastguard
Organizations established in 1829
Sea rescue organisations of the United Kingdom